The following list includes a brief about the titles of nobility or orders of chivalry used by the Marathas of India and by the Marathis/Konkanis in general.

Titles used by the Maratha Royals

The titles used by royalty, aristocracy and nobility of the Maratha Empire

Chhatrapati: Chhatrapati is an Indian royal title most equivalent to a King or an Emperor. It means the 'Lord of the Parasol' and is a title conferred upon the founder of Maratha Empire, Chhatrapati Shivaji. The title is also used by Shivaji's descendants.
Maharaj: The English equivalent of Maharaj is great king. It is a title first conferred upon Chhatrapati Shivaji's father Shahaji Raje Bhosale.
Maharani: The English equivalent of Maharani is great queen. It is a title first used by Tarabai, as regent of marathas empire .
Raje: The English equivalent of Raje is Your Majesty. It is a title first conferred upon Chhatrapati Shivaji's grandfather Maloji Raje Bhosale
Kshatriya Kulavantas: It means 'The Head of the Kshatriya varna' and was a title first given to Chhatrapati Shivaji at the time of his coronation
Sinhasanadhishwar: It means 'the enthroned King' and was a title first given to Chhatrapati Shivaji at the time of his coronation
Peshwa: It is a word of Persian origin and means 'Foremost' or 'the first minister' or 'Premier' (or Prime Minister). It was a title given to the prime ministers of the Maratha Empire
Peshwin: The wife of a Peshwa
  Chitnis: It means the Personal Secretary and high-ranking minister of the Chhatrapati, usually from the Chandraseniya Kayastha Prabhu community.
 (Chitnis)
Daria Sarang: It means the Chief or Admiral of the Maratha Navy
Senakhaskhel: It means the Commander of the armies of the state (Maratha Army). It is a designation created by Rajaram I.
Shamsher Bahadur: It is a title conferred upon the Maharajas of Baroda (the Gaekwads) and means a distinguished swordsman
Maharajadhiraj Raj Rajeshwar Alija Bahadur: It is a title used by the Maharajas of Indore (the Holkars). For example, Maharajadhiraj Raj Rajeshwar Alija Bahadur H.H. Yashwant Rao Holkar
Raj Rajeshwar: It means 'king of kings' and is a title conferred upon the Holkar (Maratha) Maharajas.
Rajadhiraj: It means 'King of Kings'. For example, it was conferred upon H.H. Rajadhiraj Jijasinghraje Gharge-Desai (Deshmukh)
Maharajadhiraj: It means 'Great King of Kings'. For example, it was conferred upon H. H. Maharajadhiraj Rajeshwar Sawai Tukoji Rao Holkar Bahadur K.G.C.S.I.
Naib Wakil-i-Mutlaq: It means Deputy Regent of Mughal affairs. It was a title conferred upon Shrimant Maharaja Mahadaji Shinde (Scindia) by the Mughals.
I'timad-al-Daula: It means Trusted of the State. It was title conferred to Gharge-Desai (Deshmukh) family by Mughals, since the family was important asset for throne of Delhi.
Shikke-i-Bhaudar: This title was given to Gharge-Desai Deshmukh's by Delhi Sultanate and was continued by Mughal Empire because the family held the traditional royal rights to issue coins behalf of Delhi Throne.
Amir-al-Umara: It means the Head of the Amirs and was a title conferred upon Shrimant Maharaja Mahadaji Shinde (Scindia) by the Mughals, since he helped the Mughal Emperor, Shah Alam II, ascend the throne of Delhi.
Shrimant: It is a title used by Maratha royals and nobles. It was also used in recent times to formally address well achieved members of society or upperclass men in Marathi. For example, 'Shrimant' Bajirao Peshwa aka Baji Rao I or 'Shrimant' Dnyaneshwar Agashe.
Sardar: It is a title used by the most senior Mahratta nobles, for example Shrimant 'Sardar' Ranoji Rao Scindia Bahadur, Subedar of Malwa
Mankari: Mānkari (Maankari) is a hereditary title used by Maratha nobles who held land grants, and cash allowances. They were entitled to certain ceremonial honours and held an official position at the Darbar (court).
Sawai: 'Sawai' in Marathi means 'a notch above the rest'. For example, it was a title conferred upon His Highness Shrimant Sawai Madhavrao Peshwa aka Madhu Rao II Narayan
Pant Pratinidhi: It means a vicegerent; title borne by a distinguished Maratha family.
Nawab: It is a title used by the Nawabs of Banda (a vassal of Maratha polity), such as the Nawab of Banda, Ali Bahadur, the grandson of Shreemant Bajirao I
Desai: It was a title given to feudal lords, and others who were granted a village or group of villages in Maharashtra, and North Karnataka. The title Desai should not be associated with a particular religion or caste, though a Desai would use the title of Rao or Rai or Raje as a suffix to his name denoting he is a king of those villages, The "Desai" title was given by Maratha emperors, Mughal emperors and by the Deccan sultanates. In Maharashtra, the title Desai is conferred to feudal lords and village council members. Most of them are either Gaud Saraswat Brahmins, Deshastha Brahmins, Karhade Brahmins and Marathas.
Desais were the rulers of Kudal (Sindhudurg) in Maharashtra.

Desai, or a loftier compound, was a rare title for rulers of a few princely states, notably - Raja Sar Desai in the Maratha Savantvadi State from 1627 until the adoption of "Raja Bahadur" in 1763.

Titles given by the British
Knight Grand Commander of the Order of the Star of India (GCSI): It is a title created by the British Empire in India and was conferred upon Indian nobles. For example, it was bestowed upon His Highness Khanderao Gaekwad of Baroda and Asaf Jah VI His Highness Mir Mahbub Ali Khan

His Highness: It is a title created by the British Empire in India and was conferred upon Indian nobles. For example, it was bestowed upon His Highness Sayajirao Gaekwad III of Baroda
Knight Grand Commander (GCIE): It is a title created by the British and is a part of The Most Eminent Order of the Indian Empire, an order of chivalry founded by Queen Victoria in 1878. For example, it was bestowed upon His Highness Colonel Sir Shahu Chhatrapati Maharaj G.C.I.E, G.C.S.I, G.C.V.O Maharaja of Kolhapur
Knight/Dame Grand Cross (GCVO): It is a title created by the British and is a part of The Royal Victorian Order. For example, it was bestowed upon His Highness Colonel Sir Shahu Chhatrapati Maharaj G.C.I.E, G.C.S.I, G.C.V.O Maharaja of Kolhapur
Kaiser-i-Hind (KIH): It was first instituted by Queen Victoria on 10 April 1900 and is literally translated to mean 'Emperor of India'. For example, it was conferred upon His Highness Sayajirao Gaekwad III, the Maratha Maharaja of Baroda

Knight Grand Cross (GCB): It is the most honourable Order of the Bath and is a British order of chivalry founded by George I on 18 May 1725. For example, it was conferred upon General His Highness Maharajadhiraj Maharaja Shrimant Sir Jayajirao Scindia Bahadur, Maharaja Scindia of Gwalior, GCB, GCSI, CIE, KIH
Farzand-i-Khas-i-Daulat-i-Inglishia: It means the 'Favoured son of the English nation'. For example, it was conferred upon the Maratha Maharajas of Baroda

Other titles
Rao: It is an honorary title used by men as a suffix to their first name, example Malhar Rao Holkar, the prince of Indore
Sinh: It is a word derived from the Sanskrit word siḿha, meaning 'lion'. It is used as a suffix to the first name, example Maharaja Pratapsinh Gaekwad or H.H. Meherban Shrimant Raja Vijaysinhrao Madhavrao Patwardhan, Raja of Sangli
Shett/Sheth: Shett/Sheth is a name given to the Daivajnas of Konkani origin residing on the west coast of India. For example, the Saldanha-Shet family is one of the well known Konkani Catholic families from Mangalore.

See also 

 Indian honorifics, Filipino, Indonesian, Malay and Thai titles originated from these
 Indian feudalism
 Maratha
 Maratha Empire
 List of Maratha dynasties and states
 Salute state
 Princely state
 List of people involved in the Maratha Empire

References

Titles in India
Noble titles
Royal titles
Maratha Empire